Great Longstone is a civil parish in the Derbyshire Dales district of Derbyshire, England. The parish contains 31 listed buildings that are recorded in the National Heritage List for England. Of these, one is listed at Grade I, the highest of the three grades, one is at Grade II*, the middle grade, and the others are at Grade II, the lowest grade.  The parish contains the village of Great Longstone and the surrounding area.  Most of the listed buildings are houses, cottages and farmhouses and associated structures.  Part of the gardens of Thornbridge Hall are in the parish, and these contain a number of listed buildings.  The other listed buildings include a church, a cross in the churchyard, the village cross, two public houses, a former guidepost used as a gatepost, a former railway station, a war memorial, and a telephone kiosk.


Key

Buildings

References

Citations

Sources

 

Lists of listed buildings in Derbyshire